The men's bantamweight event was part of the boxing programme at the 1972 Summer Olympics. The weight class allowed boxers of up to 54 kilograms to compete. The competition was held from 27 August to 10 September 1972. 38 boxers from 38 nations competed.

Medalists

Results
The following boxers took part in the event:

First round
 Stefan Förster (GDR) def. Leslie Hamilton (CAN), 4:1
 Mayaki Seydou (NIG) def. Mehmet Kunova (TUR), 3:2
 Koh Keun-Sang (KOR) def. Mohamed Ayele (ETH), KO-1
 Abdelaziz Hammi (TUN) def. Leopold Agbazo (DAH), 5:0
 Juan Francisco Rodríguez (ESP) def. Luis Ávila (PAN), 5:0
 Aldo Cosentino (FRA) def. Józef Reszpondek (POL), 5:0

Second round
 George Turpin (GBR) def. Pierre Amont N'diaye (SNG), 5:0
 Chee Yen Wang (TPE) def. Manoochehr Bahmani (IRI), 3:2
 John Mwaura Nderu (KEN) def. Eduardo Barragan (COL), 4:1
 Kim Jong-Ik (PRK) def. Deusdete Vasconselos (BRA), 4:1
 Michael Dowling (IRL) def. Ove Lundby (SWE), 4:1
 Orlando Martínez (CUB) def. Maung Win (BUR), 4:1
 Ferry Moniaga (INA) def. René Silva (NIC), 5:0
 Joe Destimo (GHA) def. Werner Schaefer (FRG), 3:2
 Buyangiin Ganbat (MGL) def. David Oleme (CMR), 5:0
 Ricardo Carreras (USA) def. Michael O'Brien (AUS), TKO-3
 Vassily Solomin (URS) def. Veepol Charndej (THA), 5:0
 Marin Lazar (ROU) def. Flevitus Bitegeko (TNZ), 5:0
 Alfonso Zamora (MEX) def. Ricardo Fortaleza (PHI), TKO-2
 Koh Keun-Sang (KOR) def. Abdelazis Hammi (TUN), 5:0
 Stefan Förster (GDR) def. Mayaki Seydou (NIG), 5:0
 Juan Francisco Rodríguez (ESP) def. Aldo Cosentino (FRA), 4:1

Third round
 George Turpin (GBR) def. Chee Yen Wang (TPE), 5:0
 John Mwaura Nderu (KEN) def. Kim Jong-Ik (PRK), 4:1
 Orlando Martínez (CUB) def. Michael Dowling (IRL), 3:2
 Ferry Moniaga (INA) def. Joe Destimo (GHA), 4:1
 Ricardo Carreras (USA) def. Buyangiin Ganbat (MGL), 3:2
 Vassily Solomin (URS) def. Marin Lazar (ROU), 4:1
 Alfonso Zamora (MEX) def. Stefan Förster (GDR), 5:0
 Juan Francisco Rodríguez (ESP) def. Koh Keun-Sang (KOR), 5:0

Quarterfinals
 George Turpin (GBR) def. John Mwaura Nderu (KEN), 4:1
 Orlando Martínez (CUB) def. Ferry Moniaga (INA), 5:0
 Ricardo Carreras (USA) def. Vassily Solomin (URS), 3:2
 Alfonso Zamora (MEX) def. Juan Francisco Rodríguez (ESP), KO-2

Semifinals
 Orlando Martínez (CUB) def. George Turpin (GBR), 3:2
 Alfonso Zamora (MEX) def. Ricardo Carreras (USA), 4:1

Final
 Orlando Martínez (CUB) def. Alfonso Zamora (MEX), 5:0

References

Bantamweight